Internationalization Index is a criterion used by the United Nations to rank nations and companies in evaluating their degree of integration with the world economy.

Internationalization Index is calculated as the number of foreign affiliates divided by the number of all affiliates.

Global economic indicators